"That's Why" can refer to the following:

 That's Why (album), a 2008 album by Craig Morgan, and the title song
 "That's Why", a 1991 single by The Party, from the album The Party
 "That's Why", a 2019 song by Illenium, from the album Ascend
 "That's Why (I Love You So)", a 1959 single by Jackie Wilson
 "That's Why (You Go Away)", a 1995 single by Danish band Michael Learns to Rock

See also
 "That Is Why", a 1990 single by the band Jellyfish